Congupna is a town in the Goulburn Valley region of Victoria, Australia. At the 2021 census, Congupna had a population of 620.

History
Congupna, known also by the name Koongoopna, was first established about 8 km north of its present location.

Congupna Post Office opened there on 1 December 1881, was renamed Congupna Township around 1909 and closed in 1953. Congupna Road Post Office opened on 17 October 1881 shortly after the railway station of the same name. These were both renamed Congupna in 1968.

Today
Congupna Football Club  play  Australian Rules Football in the Murray Football League.  Former Congupna Player Damian Drum went on to play several games 50+ with Geelong in the Australian Football League (AFL).  After retiring as a player he went on to coach the Fremantle in the AFL.  He is now the representative for the seat of Nicholls in the Australian House of Representatives since the 2016 federal election as a member of The Nationals. Collingwood footballer Steele Sidebottom also hails from Congupna.

References

See also

 Congupna Football Club
 Congupna railway station, Victoria

Towns in Victoria (Australia)
City of Greater Shepparton